Celaenorrhinus putra, commonly known as the Bengal spotted flat, is a species of butterfly in the family Hesperiidae. It is found in India and south-east Asia.

Description

Subspecies
Celaenorrhinus putra putra (India)
Celaenorrhinus putra piepersi Fruhstorfer, 1909 (Java)
Celaenorrhinus putra sanda Evans, 1941 (Burma, Thailand, Laos, Malay Peninsula)
Celaenorrhinus putra brahmaputra Elwes & Edwards, 1897 (Kinabalu)

References

Butterflies described in 1866
putra
Butterflies of Indochina
Taxa named by Frederic Moore